Harry Buckle (6 March 1882, Belfast – 1965) was an Irish footballer who played for Sunderland and the Ireland national football team.

Club career 
He made his debut for Sunderland, after joining from Irish side Cliftonville, against Stoke City on 8 November 1902 in a 1–1 draw. He went on to make 44 league appearances scoring 14 goals for Sunderland, before moving onto Portsmouth helping them to win a trophy. He had a short stay at the south coast side, and quickly moved onto Bristol Rovers and became the third player to receive international recognition for the club. Coventry City was his next club as he combined playing and managerial roles, to become Coventry's first ever manager. Buckle then moved around Irish clubs; Belfast Celtic, Glenavon, Belfast United and Fordsons before retiring from playing.

He scored in the final of the Gold Cup for Belfast Celtic against Glentoran in 1912.

International career 

Buckle gained his first international cap for Ireland while at Sunderland, against England on 12 March 1904 in a 3–1 defeat. In all he made three international appearances, without scoring.

References

External links
 Harry Buckle's careers stats at The Stat Cat
 Harry Buckle's player profile at Northern Ireland's Footballing Greats
 

1882 births
1965 deaths
Belfast Celtic F.C. players
Bristol Rovers F.C. players
Cliftonville F.C. players
Coventry City F.C. players
Glenavon F.C. players
Irish association footballers (before 1923)
NIFL Premiership players
Portsmouth F.C. players
Pre-1950 IFA international footballers
Sunderland A.F.C. players
Fordsons F.C. players
Association football forwards
Football managers from Northern Ireland
Coventry City F.C. managers